The Lithuania Song Festival (also called The Song Celebration) is a massive traditional song and dance festival. Since regaining the Independence in 1990, the event has gained the status of the national celebration. The most recent event took place between 30 June and 6 July 2018. The 2018 edition of the Song Celebration was dedicated to the Centenary of the Restoration of the independent state of Lithuania and took place in Kaunas and Vilnius. The main event has been hosted in Vingis Park in Vilnius.

On 7 November 2003, UNESCO proclaimed the tradition of the Song and Dance Celebration in Lithuania, Latvia and Estonia as a Masterpiece of the Oral and Intangible Heritage of Humanity and in 2008 added it to the List of the Intangible Cultural Heritage.

History

19th-century Song Festival in the Lithuania Minor
At the end 19th century the Rambynas Hill, located in the Lithuania Minor region, became a favorite place for singing and for gathering of artists. The 17 February 1895 is recorded in the history as the debut of the first Lithuanian choir. The concert was held to celebrate the 10th anniversary of the Lithuanian Birutė Society.

On 2 December 1895 the Tilsit Lithuanian Singers’ Community was founded led by Vydūnas (Vilius Storosta). The community used to organise theatre performances, concerts, evenings, St. John's Day festivities in Tilsit, Klaipėda, Gumbinė, Verdainė, Rusnė, Ragainė, Juodkrantė, Smalininkai. Up to one thousand spectators used to gather at the events, the so-called the winter and summer Lithuanian celebrations, which later in 1902 were re-titled as the Song Celebrations.

On 6 June 1927, the first Lithuanian Song Festival of Klaipėda Region took place. 12 choirs comprising 800 singers and 100 orchestra took part in the event. The joint choir was conducted by Antanas Vaičiūnas and Vydūnas. In 1928, the Second Song Festival of Klaipėda was organized in Šilutė.

In interwar Lithuania
The first song festival in the Interwar Lithuania was held on 23–25 August 1924 in Petras Vileišis Square, Kaunas, during the Agricultural and Industrial Exhibition. The festival's initiator was Juozas Žilevičius, with chief conductors Juozas Naujalis, Stasys Šimkus and Julius Štarka. The choirs conductor was Kostas Gurevičius, Mykolas Karka, Apolinaras Likerauskas, Vladas Paulauskas and Antanas Vaičiūnas. 77 choirs participated, comprising 3,000 singers, attracting 50,000 spectators.

Since then, the song festival became a tradition in Lithuania. The Second Lithuanian Song Festival was dedicated to the 10th anniversary of Lithuania's Independence, and took place in 1–2 July 1928 in Kaunas. The appearances included 51 church choirs, 22 choirs of gymnasia and other schools, 19 choirs of various associations and organizations, and the choir of the Riga's Lithuanian "Lights" (headed by Juozas Karosas), featuring 6,000 singers. The joint choir was conducted by Stasys Šimkus and Juozas Gruodis. During the celebration 250 gymnastics exercises took place at the school square. They were accompanied by a choir that was singing popular folk songs. The Second Song Festival was attended by about 100,000 spectators.

The third song festival was held on 20 June 1930 and was dedicated to celebrate the 500th anniversary of Vytautas the Great's death. About 200 choirs and 9,000 singers participated in the event. The event performed 24 pieces - one psalm, six original pieces and a number of harmonized folk songs. The chief conductors was Juozas Naujalis, Nikodemas Martinonis, and Juozas Gruodis.

The first folklore dance festival is held on 29 October 1937. A celebration was organized in Kaunas by the Lithuania Youth. 448 dancers from different regions of Lithuania performed a number of national folklore dances.

Between 1920 and 1944, a number of regional, city and other local song festivals were held, organized by various public organizations. Since 1930 some regional song and sport festivals were held for schoolchildren.

In Lithuanian SSR
The tradition of song festivals was continued during the Soviet occupation. In 1946, 188 choirs with 11,778 singers participated in the song festival, and performed songs composed by 15 composers and included 15 Lithuanian harmonized songs. The chief Conductors for the 1946 edition were Nikodemas Martinonis, Jonas Švedas, Konradas Kaveckas and Antanas Ilčiukas.

From 1950 on, the National Dance Day was added to the Song Festival. The festival was attended by 57 dance groups, 41 ensembles and 13 concert bands.

Since 1950, the song and dance festival events were organized periodically every 5 years. The tradition of song and dance festivals, like other arts, contained the dogma of Soviet aesthetics and politics, and Lithuanian art was supposed to be a form of nationalism, but with socialist content.

The Vingis Park Amphitheater was opened in time for the 1960 edition of the festival. The amphitheater was based on a modified design of the Estonian Song Festival Grounds in Tallinn.

The Youth Song Festival has sprung up from the song and dance festival tradition. It became popular and became an independent event, held periodically since 1964.

Lithuanian diaspora
Lithuanian diasporas also held the song festivals. The first Lithuanian diaspora song festival was organized in Würzburg, Germany, in 1956. The most recent festival was held July 5th, 2015, in Chicago, IL, with 1,400 singers participating.

Since 1990
After the restoration of Lithuania's independence in 1990, the Lithuanian Song Festival reverted to its traditional identity and gained the status of a national tradition. The festival is considered to be the unique manifestation of the national culture and the symbol of unity and strength. The song festival's primary parts are Folklore Day, unfolding the geographical and genre diversity of traditional culture, and the Ensembles Night.

The 13th Lithuanian Song Festival was held in 1990. The event was called the National Song Day. Lithuania was under the Blockade and many participants from abroad were unable to attend. The event featured 33,000 participants.

The 14th Lithuanian Song Festival was held in 1994. The event regained the World Lithuanians Song Festival name. The event was The event featured 26,000 participants from Lithuania, and 1,200 Lithuanians from abroad.

The 15th Lithuanian Song Festival was held in 1998. The event was commemorating the 80th anniversary of the first Lithuanian independence reinstatement. The event featured 31,000 participants from Lithuania, and 1,100 Lithuanians from abroad.

The 16th Lithuanian Song Festival was held in 2003. The event was dubbed "We". The event featured 32,000 participants from Lithuania, and 1,000 Lithuanians from abroad.

The 17th Lithuanian Song Festival was held in 2007. The event was named The Circle of Life. The event featured 36,600 participants.

The 18th Lithuanian Song Festival was held in 2009. The event carried the name The Acapella of the Centuries. The event featured 40,000 participants.

The 19th Lithuanian Song Festival was held in 2014 and was named This Is My Home. The event featured grand opening by the President of Lithuania Dalia Grybauskaitė. Over 37,000 people were expected to attend the festival. National Costume Day was held for the first time at the festival. The Folklore Day opened the festival, starring 6,000 performers in Sereikiskiu Park. The final day in Vingis Park showcased 12,000 singers in 400 choirs.

The 20th Lithuanian Song Festival was held in 2018. The event was dedicated to the Centenary of the Restoration of the independent state of Lithuania. The President of Lithuania Dalia Grybauskaitė opened the event. On 6 July at 21:00 the Lithuanian national anthem was sung simultaneously in various Lithuanian towns as well as abroad. It was transmitted live on the state television and was viewed by a record 300,000 viewers. 2 euro commemorative coin was issued to commemorate the event.

See also
Estonian Song Festival
Latvian Song and Dance Festival

References

External links

Official website of the Lithuanian Song Festival

Music festivals established in 1924
1924 establishments in Lithuania
Music festivals in Lithuania
Folk festivals in Lithuania
Music in Kaunas
Music in Vilnius